Garrett Hill station is a SEPTA rapid transit station in the community of Garrett Hill, in Radnor Township, Pennsylvania. It serves the Norristown High Speed Line (Route 100) and is located between Garrett Avenue and Lowry's Lane, near Lancaster Avenue (US 30) in Radnor Township, although SEPTA gives the address as being near "Lowerys" Lane & Fairfax Road. Local, Hughes Park Express, and Norristown Express trains stop at Garrett Hill.

Station layout

References

External links

 Lowrys Lane entrance from Google Maps Street View

SEPTA Norristown High Speed Line stations
Radnor Township, Delaware County, Pennsylvania
Railway stations in the United States opened in 1907